Koddiyar fort  (Koddiyar Balakotuwa) was the first fort that was built by Dutch in Ceylon. It was constructed in 1622 and is located on the southern side of Koddiyar Bay (Koddiyar means 'fort by the river').

Kandyan king Senarat granted permission to build a fort in Koddiyar (now known as Muttur) due a treaty between the king and the Dutch. The treaty had a purpose of get rid of the Portuguese from the country. However, Portuguese destroyed the partly built fort since they had control in Trincomalee area including Koddiyar. Later, the Dutch defeated the Portuguese in the island, and Koddiyar fort was rebuilt and strengthened in 1658.

References

Further reading 
 

Dutch forts in Sri Lanka
Forts in Eastern Province, Sri Lanka
Buildings and structures in Trincomalee District
1622 establishments in the Dutch Empire